Buck Rogers in the 25th Century may refer to various science fiction works featuring the character Buck Rogers, including:

 Buck Rogers in the 25th Century (radio series) (1932-1947)
 Buck Rogers in the 25th Century (film) (1979)
 Buck Rogers in the 25th Century (TV series) (1979–1981)
 Buck Rogers in the 25th Century (comic strip) (originally Buck Rogers in the 25th Century A.D.), a 1979–1983 revival of the original Buck Rogers comic strip

See also
 Duck Dodgers in the 24½th Century